Stanley Shapiro (July 16, 1925 – July 21, 1990) was an American screenwriter and producer responsible for three of Doris Day's most successful films.

Born in Brooklyn, New York, Shapiro earned his first screen credit for South Sea Woman in 1953. His work for Day earned him Oscar nominations for Lover Come Back and That Touch of Mink and a win for Pillow Talk, and Mink won him the Writers Guild of America Award for Best Written American Comedy, which he shared with his partner Nate Monaster.

Life and career
Shapiro was born and raised in Brooklyn. He was Jewish. He dropped out of Brooklyn College and began selling jokes to comedians. He eventually wrote for Fred Allen on radio and then for George Burns and Gracie Allen. He followed Burns and Allen to Hollywood and worked on their television show.

He produced the first season of Ray Bolger's ABC sitcom, Where's Raymond?, and was replaced in the second season by Paul Henning, as the series was renamed The Ray Bolger Show.

Additional writing credits include Operation Petticoat, Come September, Bedtime Story, Me, Natalie, For Pete's Sake, Dirty Rotten Scoundrels, and Carbon Copy.

"Although I find social institutions, manners, customs and prejudices a bit ridiculous, I do not regard them as a satirist", he told an interviewer in 1962. "I am a humorist. Will Rogers was a satirist, Laurel and Hardy were humorists. Believe me, humor is much harder to write. It was a lot easier for Will Rogers to get a laugh by doing a pun about the Government than it was for Laurel and Hardy to figure out a routine on how to move a piano manually from the basement to the fifth floor."

Shapiro's last project was the television movie Running Against Time, based on his novel A Time to Remember. Broadcast four months after his death from leukemia in Los Angeles, it was dedicated to his memory.

Shapiro died on July 21, 1990, five days after his 65th birthday.

Select credits
The George Burns and Gracie Allen Show (1950) (TV series) – pilot – writer
South Sea Woman (1953) – writer
Where's Raymond? (1954–55) (TV series) – writer, producer
Hey, Jeannie! (1956–57) (TV series) – writer
Strictly for Pleasure (1958) – writer
The Real McCoys (1958) (TV series) – writer
Pillow Talk (1959) – writer
Operation Petticoat (1959) – writer
McGarry and His Mouse (1960) (TV movie) – writer, producer
The Tab Hunter Show (1960–61) – creator, producer
Come September (1961) – writer
Lover Come Back (1961) – writer, producer
That Touch of Mink (1962) – writer, producer
The Comedy Spot (TV series) (1962) (TV series) – episode "For the Love of Mike"
Bedtime Story (1964) – writer, producer
A Very Special Favor (1965) – writer, producer
How to Save a Marriage and Ruin Your Life (1968) – writer, producer
Me, Natalie (1969) – writer, producer
For Pete's Sake (1974) – writer, producer
The Best of Times (1974) (TV movie)
The Seniors (1978) – writer, producer
Carbon Copy (1981) – writer, producer
The Ferret (1984) (TV movie)
Dirty Rotten Scoundrels (1988)
Running Against Time (1990) (TV movie) (book "A Time to Remember") / (teleplay)

Other writings
"The Engagement Baby" (1973) – play
"Simon's Soul" (1977) – novel
"A Time to Remember" (1986) – novel

References

External links

American male screenwriters
Film producers from New York (state)
Best Original Screenplay Academy Award winners
Writers Guild of America Award winners
Writers from New York City
1925 births
1990 deaths
20th-century American businesspeople
Screenwriters from New York (state)
Brooklyn College alumni
20th-century American male writers
20th-century American screenwriters